Dakota Duran Dozier (born April 30, 1991) is an American football guard of the National Football League (NFL). He was drafted by the New York Jets in the fourth round of the 2014 NFL Draft. He played college football at Furman, where he was recognized as a unanimous All-American.

High school
Dozier attended Brookland-Cayce High School in Cayce, South Carolina, where he played offensive tackle, defensive tackle, and defensive end. He earned all-region, all-area, and all-state honors, while serving as captain and was named team MVP.  He also won a region individual wrestling championship in his senior year.

He was an unranked recruit by Rivals.com.

College career
Dozier attended Furman University, where he was a member of the Furman Paladins football team from 2009 to 2013. During his career, he started 44 games, all at left tackle, and was named an All-SoCon selection for three consecutive seasons (second-team in 2011, first-team in 2012 and 2013). He was twice named an FCS All-American by the Associated Press, including being named a unanimous All-American in 2013, making him only the seventh unanimous All-American in school history.

Professional career

New York Jets
Dozier was drafted by the New York Jets in the fourth round (137th overall) of the 2014 NFL Draft.

In 2017, Dozier played in 14 games, starting three at right guard in place of the injured Brian Winters.

On April 6, 2018, Dozier re-signed with the Jets.

Minnesota Vikings
On April 4, 2019, Dozier signed with the Minnesota Vikings, being reunited with his 2018 position coach with the Jets, Rick Dennison.

On March 30, 2020, Dozier re-signed with the Vikings. He started all 16 games at left guard for the Vikings in 2020.

On March 30, 2021, Dozier re-signed with the Vikings. He was released on August 31, 2021 and re-signed to the practice squad the next day. He was promoted to the active roster on December 21.

Chicago Bears
On March 23, 2022, Dozier signed a one year deal with the Chicago Bears. On June 21, 2022, Dozier was placed on injured reserve a week after suffering an apparent left leg injury during a minicamp practice.

References

External links
Furman Paladins bio

1991 births
Living people
Players of American football from South Carolina
People from West Columbia, South Carolina
American football offensive guards
American football offensive tackles
Furman Paladins football players
New York Jets players
Minnesota Vikings players
Chicago Bears players